Alexander Malcolm "Sandy" Nicholson (November 25, 1900 – October 12, 1991) was a Canadian clergyman, farmer and politician.

He was born in Lucknow, Ontario, the son of Alexander Nicholson and Isabelle MacDonald, and was educated in Lucknow and at the University of Saskatchewan. In 1928, Nicholson married Marian Leila Massey.

Nicholson served as a United Church of Canada minister at Hudson Bay Junction, Saskatchewan and had a farm in Sturgis, Saskatchewan. He became an organizer for the Co-operative Commonwealth Federation in 1935, became the national treasurer of the party in 1942 and from 1944 to 1950 and served as a CCF Member of Parliament from 1940 to 1949 and again from 1953 until his defeat in 1958. He then served as a CCF-NDP member of the Saskatchewan legislature in the 1960s. From 1960 until 1964 he was the province's Minister of Social Welfare and Rehabilitation. He continued as a Member of the Legislative Assembly (MLA) until his defeat in the 1967 provincial election.

Archives 
There are Alexander Malcolm Nicholson fonds at Library and Archives Canada (Archival reference number R4793), the Archives of Ontario and United Church of Canada Archives.

References 

1900 births
1991 deaths
Co-operative Commonwealth Federation MPs
20th-century Canadian politicians
Members of the House of Commons of Canada from Saskatchewan
Saskatchewan Co-operative Commonwealth Federation MLAs